Chernolesovsky is a rural locality (a selo) in Krasnoyarsky Selsoviet, Ufimsky District, Bashkortostan, Russia. The population was 1,118 as of 2010. There are 20 streets.

Geography 
Chernolesovsky is located 23 km northwest of Ufa (the district's administrative centre) by road. Mudarisovo is the nearest rural locality.

References 

Rural localities in Ufimsky District